This is a list of people connected to Stony Brook University.

University presidents

Notable faculty 
This list includes both present and former faculty members.

Notable alumni

References

External links
 Stony Brook University – Official website

State University of New York at Stony Brook
 List of State University of New York at Stony Brook